Augusto Céspedes Patzi (6 February 1904, Cochabamba – 9 May 1997,  La Paz) was a Bolivian writer, politician, diplomat, and journalist. He was the brother-in-law of writer Carlos Montenegro.

Career
Céspedes studied law and received his degree in La Paz.

In 1927, he founded the Nationalist Party. He was a leader in the Revolutionary Nationalist Movement (MNR).

He worked as a journalist on the front in the Chaco War, writing for the newspaper El Universal. His reports were compiled and published in the book Crónicas heroicas de una guerra estúpida, published in 1975. He also founded the MNR daily La Calle and directed La Nación newspaper in La Paz.

He was a noted politician, serving as a deputy in Bolivian legislatures (three times: 1938, 1944, and 1956), and in diplomatic offices. He served as Bolivia's Ambassador to Paraguay in 1945, and to Italy in 1953, and distinguished himself as Ambassador to UNESCO.

Works
Céspedes wrote various biographies of presidents such as Daniel Salamanca, Germán Busch Becerra, and Gualberto Villarroel. He also wrote stories and novels:Augusto Céspedes
 1936: Sangre de Mestizos
 1946: Metal del diablo
 1956: El dictador suicida
 1966: El presidente colgado
 1968: Trópico enamorado
 1975: Crónicas heroicas de una guerra estúpida

Awards
 1957: National Literature Prize

External links
"Augusto Céspedes o la pasión de narrar" por Jaime Iturri Salmón.
Biografía de Céspedes
Polémica entre Jorge Abelardo Ramos, Augusto Céspedes, Guillermo Lora y Antezana E.

1904 births
1997 deaths
Bolivian male writers
Bolivian politicians
Bolivian diplomats
Revolutionary Nationalist Movement politicians